Pseudanthessiidae is a family of cyclopoid copepods in the order Cyclopoida. There are about 7 genera and more than 60 described species in Pseudanthessiidae.

Genera
These seven genera belong to the family Pseudanthessiidae:
 Mecomerinx Humes, 1977
 Pseudanthessius Claus, 1889
 Senariellus Humes, 1977
 Sipadania Humes & Lane, 1993
 Spidadania
 Spiranthessius Stock, 1995
 Tubiporicola Kim I.H., 2009

References

Cyclopoida
Articles created by Qbugbot
Crustacean families